Perlentaucher is a German online magazine. It was founded and is being published by Anja Seeliger and Thierry Chervel and has been available since March 15, 2000.

The magazine styles itself as a culture magazine, with its main focus on German culture and feuilleton and a daily overview of book reviews that have been published in a range of main German newspapers. With more than 500.000 visits per month Perlentaucher claims to be the biggest culture magazine in Germany.

In 2003, Perlentaucher was awarded the prestigious Grimme Award for online journalism, the jury calling it a "one-of-a-kind 'journal of journals'".

Another online magazine run by Perlentaucher Medien was the English-language signandsight.com. Signandsight was first published in 2005, bringing a news digest of articles on European cultural topics. It was discontinued in March 2012 due to the presently unfavourable "economic climate".

The Perlentaucher magazine also cooperates with the website Salon run by the Slovak organisation Project Forum.

Footnotes

External links

www.perlentaucher.de published in German
www.signandsight.com published in English (Archive 2005–2012)

2000 establishments in Germany
Cultural magazines published in Germany
German-language magazines
Magazines established in 2000
Magazines published in Berlin
Online magazines